Daniel Scînteie (born 1 July 1968) is a retired Romanian football striker.

References

1968 births
Living people
Romanian footballers
FC Dinamo București players
FCM Bacău players
Hapoel Be'er Sheva F.C. players
Hapoel Beit She'an F.C. players
CSM Ceahlăul Piatra Neamț players
Association football forwards
Romanian expatriate footballers
Expatriate footballers in Israel
Romanian expatriate sportspeople in Israel
Liga Leumit players